Teoti Kerei Te Hioirangi Te Whaiti (1890–1964) was a notable New Zealand tribal leader, farmer and community leader. Of Māori descent, he identified with the Ngāti Kahungunu iwi. He was born in Pirinoa, Wairarapa, New Zealand in 1890.

References

1890 births
1964 deaths
Ngāti Kahungunu people
People from the Wairarapa